Guillermo Óscar Santa Cruz (born January 6, 1984) is an Argentine actor who has a  degree in economics.

Biography 
In 2004 he traveled to China with his family. Soon after, his family returned to Argentina, Guillermo decided to stay to study Mandarin Chinese in depth and pursue a Bachelor's Degree in Economics. After graduating, he worked at the Argentine Embassy in Beijing. After eight years of residence in China, he returned to Argentina in 2012. He completed a Master's Degree in Agribusiness and Food and served as an external consultant in the Ministry of Agriculture, Livestock and Fisheries of the Nation in different economic and commercial development projects.

Career 
Guillermo Santa Cruz began his career in the television series Quiero gritar que te amo in 1990. In 1991, he was part of the cast of the television series ¡Grande, pa!. In 1991, he was part of the cast of the television series Cosecharás tu siembra. In 1991, he was part of the cast of the television series El árbol azul. In 1993, he was part of the cast of the television series El club de los baby sitters. In 1994, he was part of the cast of the television series Más allá del horizonte. In 1994, he was part of the cast of the television series Inconquistable corazón. In 1995, he was part of the cast of the television series Dulce Ana. From 1996 to 1999, he was part of the cast of the youth television series Chiquititas. Between 1996 and 1999, he made the theatrical seasons of Chiquititas. In August 2001, he makes a small participation in the youth television series Chiquititas. In 2001, he was summoned by Cris Morena for the special Chiquititas de Oro where he and the most prominent of all seasons came together to receive the award Chiquititas de Oro. In 2002, he was part of the cast of the youth television series Rebelde Way. In 2002, he was part of the theatrical season of Rebelde Way.

Filmography

Television

Theater

Discography

Soundtrack albums 

 1996 — Chiquititas Vol. 2
 1997 — Chiquititas Vol. 3
 1998  — Chiquititas Vol. 4
 1999  — Chiquititas Vol. 5

External links 
 
 Santa Cruz's serials.ru page

1984 births
Argentine male actors
Living people
People from Buenos Aires